Island Edge Inc. is a Canadian television production company founded by Rick Mercer and Gerald Lunz in 1998.

It has produced Talking to Americans and Made in Canada (both with Salter Street Films) and Rick Mercer Report for CBC Television.

Television production companies of Canada